Belly may refer to:

Anatomy
 The abdomen, the part of the body between the pelvis and the thorax; or the stomach
 A beer belly, an overhang of fat above the waist, presumed to be caused by regular beer drinking
 Belly dance
 The fleshy, central part of a skeletal muscle (also known as a "muscle belly")

People
 The nickname of the England cricketer Ian Bell
 Leon-August-Adolphe Belly, a 19th-century French painter
 Pierre Belly (1738–1814), Louisiana planter, lawyer and judge
 Belly Mujinga (1972/3–2020), Congolese-born transport worker who died in London from COVID-19

Places
 Belly River, river in Alberta, Canada

Music
 Belly (band), American alternative rock band
 Belly (rapper) (born 1984), Canadian rap artist of Palestinian origin
 Lead Belly (1889–1949), real name Huddie William Ledbetter, American folk and blues musician 
 The surface of a sound board, of a string instrument
 A kind of steelpan

Other
 Belly (loyalty program), a digital loyalty program for small businesses
 Belly (film), a 1998 film
 Belly (soundtrack), a 1998 soundtrack album of the film
 The draft, in a sail
 Tuna, belly (fatty tuna), also known as toro, used in Japanese food
 Belly landing, of an aircraft when it crashes onto a runway with its undercarriage retracted

See also 
 Belley (disambiguation)